Danièle Parola (March 28, 1905 – September 2, 1998) was a French film actress. She starred in the 1932 crime film Narcotics. She was married to the actor and producer André Daven.

Selected filmography
 The Orchid Dancer (1928)
 Delicatessen (1930)
 Narcotics (1932)
 The Last Blow (1932)
 The Merry Widow (1934)
 Adventure in Paris (1936)
 Under Western Eyes (1936)
 Aloha, le chant des îles (1937)

References

Bibliography
 Youngkin, Stephen. The Lost One: A Life of Peter Lorre. University Press of Kentucky, 2005.

External links

1905 births
1998 deaths
French film actresses
French silent film actresses
Actresses from Paris
20th-century French actresses